Gent is a shortened form of the word gentleman. It may also refer to:

 Ghent (Dutch: Gent), a Belgian city
 K.A.A. Gent, a football club from Ghent
 K.R.C. Gent, a football club from Ghent
 Gent RFC, a rugby club in Ghent
 .gent, a GeoTLD (top-level domain) for the city of Ghent
 Gent (hyperelastic model), rubber elasticity model
 Gent Cakaj (born 1990), Albanian politician
 Gent Strazimiri (born 1972), Albanian politician and former Deputy Minister of Interior Affairs
 Gent (surname)
 Gent (magazine), a defunct pornographic magazine
 Honeywell Gent, a brand of fire alarm systems previously known as Gents' of Leicester

See also

Gents (disambiguation)
Van Gent (disambiguation)
Gente (disambiguation)
Ghent (disambiguation)
Gentleman (disambiguation)
Gentlewoman (disambiguation)
 
Lady (disambiguation)